Nalankilli (Middle Tamil: Nālankilli Cōḻaṉ;  Classical Sanskrit: Nālankilli Cōla;  – ) was one of the Tamil kings of Early Cholas of the Chola Dynasty who ruled Tamilakam in the Southern India and was mentioned in the ancient Sangam Literature. He was the son of Karikala Chola the Great. Nalankilli was mentioned in context with a civil war between him and another Chola king Nedunkilli. The information known about him are from the fragmentary stanzas of Purananuru and Manimekalai.

Sources 

The source available to us on Nalankilli is mentioned in Sangam poetry and Manimekalai. The period covered by the extant literature of the Sangam is unfortunately not easy to determine with any measure of accurate certainty. Except the longer epics Cilappatikaram and Manimekalai, which by common consent belong to the Sangam age, the poems have reached us in the forms of systematic anthologies. Each individual poem has generally attached to it a colophon on the authorship and subject matter of the poem, the name of the king or chieftain to whom the poem relates and the occasion which called forth the eulogy are also found.

It is from these colophons and rarely from the texts of the poems themselves, that we gather the names of many kings and chieftains and the poets patronised by them. The task of reducing these names to an ordered scheme in which the different generations of contemporaries can be marked off one another has not been easy. To add to the confusions, some historians have even denounced these colophons as later additions and untrustworthy as historical documents.

Any attempt at extracting a systematic chronology and data from these poems should be aware of the casual nature of these poems and the wide difference between the purposes of the anthologist who collected these poems and the historian’s attempts are arriving at a continuous history.

Nalankilli the Ruler

Nalankilli forms the subject of no fewer than fourteen poems in Purananuru. These poems suggest that Nalankilli continued to enjoy a vague hegemony among the other Tamil kings as did by Karikala Chola (Purananuru – 31). The same poet Kovur Kilar, proving that he was not a sycophant, exhorts his patron to sue for peace instead of continuing the siege of Urayur against the rival Chola Nedunkilli.

Kaverippatinam was Nalankilli’s capital (Purananuru – 30) and he enjoyed the benefits of its extensive trade. However the people were not in a contented state of mind due to the continuing civil strife. We perceive this from the melancholy tones of the poems by the poet Urayur Mudukannan Sattanar on Nalankilli (Purananuru – 27, 28, 29).

Nalankilli like many other princes of his age, cultivated literature himself, and two of his poems survive (Purananuru – 72 and 73)

Civil War 

Purananuru speaks of the war between two Cholas Nalankilli and Nedunkilli, which lasted until the death of Nedunkilli at the battlefields of Kariyaru. These two Cholas must have belonged to the rival branches of the Chola families, which ruled from Kaverippattinam and Urayur as their capitals.

Kovur Kilar's pleadings were of no avail and the civil war only ended with the death of Nedunkilli.

Nalankilli died at a place called Ilavandigaippalli (colophon of Purananuru – 61).

See also
 Sangam Literature
 Early Cholas
 Legendary early Chola kings

References 

 
 Mudaliar, A.S, Abithana Chintamani (1931), Reprinted 1984 Asian Educational Services, New Delhi.
 Nilakanta Sastri, K.A. (1935). The CōĻas, University of Madras, Madras (Reprinted 1984).
 Nilakanta Sastri, K.A. (1955). A History of South India, OUP, New Delhi (Reprinted 2002).
 Project Madurai – Purananuru eText - http://tamilnation.co/literature/ettuthokai/pm0057.pdf

Chola dynasty
Ancient Indian monarchs